In Pakistan, a tehsil is an administrative sub-division of a District. Those are sub-divided into union councils. Here is a list of all the tehsils of the Khyber Pakhtunkhwa.

Bannu Division

Bannu District
 Bannu Tehsil
 Domel Tehsil
 Kakki Tehsil
 Baka Khel Tehsil
 Meryan Tehsil
 Wazir Tehsil
 Gumatti

Lakki Marwat District
 Lakki Marwat Tehsil
 Sari Naurang Tehsil
 Ghazni Khel Tehsil
 Bettani Tehsil
 Chichindai Kalai

North Waziristan District

 Datta Khel Tehsil
 Dossali Tehsil
 Gharyum Tehsil
 Ghulam Khan Tehsil
 Mir Ali Tehsil
 Miran Shah Tehsil
 Razmak Tehsil
 Shewa Tehsil
 Spinwam Tehsil

Dera Ismail Khan Division

Dera Ismail Khan District

 Dera Ismail Khan
 Daraban Tehsil
 Kulachi Tehsil
 Paharpur Tehsil
 Paroa Tehsil
 Darazinda Tehsil

Lower South Waziristan District

 Wana Tehsil
 Toi Khulla Tehsil
 Birmil Tehsil
 Serwekai Tehsil

Upper South Waziristan District

 Makin Tehsil
 Tiarza Tehsil
 Ladha Tehsil
 Sararogha Tehsil

Tank District
 Tank Tehsil
 Jandola Tehsil

Hazara Division

Mansehra District

 Bala Kot Tehsil
 Mansehra Tehsil
 Oghi Tehsil
 Baffa Pakhal
Darband

Abbottabad District

 Abbottabad Tehsil
 Havelian Tehsil
 Lora Tehsil
 Lower Tanawal Tehsil

Batagram District

 Allai Tehsil
 Batagram Tehsil (Banna)

Haripur District

 Ghazi Tehsil
 Haripur Tehsil
 Khanpur Tehsil

Lower Kohistan District

 Bankad / Ranolia Tehsil
 Pattan Tehsil

Torghar District

 Judba Tehsil
 Khander Tehsil
 Daur Maira Tehsil

Upper Kohistan District

 Dassu Tehsil
 Kandia Tehsil
 Harban Basha Tehsil
 Seo Tehsil

Kolai-Palas District

 Bataira / Kolai
 Palas

Kohat Division

Hangu District

 Hangu Tehsil
 Tall Tehsil

Karak District

 Karak Tehsil
 Banda Daud Shah Tehsil
 Takht-e-Nasrati Tehsil

Kohat District

 Kohat Tehsil
 Lachi Tehsil
 Gumbat Tehsil
 Dara Adam Khel Tehsil

Kurram District
 Central Kurram Tehsil
 Lower Kurram Tehsil
 Upper Kurram Tehsil

Orakzai District

 Central Orakzai Tehsil
 Ismail Zai Tehsil
 Lower Orakzai Tehsil
 Upper Orakzai Tehsil

Malakand Division

Buner District

 Daggar Tehsil (Buner)
 Gagra Tehsil
 Khudu Khel
 Mandanr Tehsil
 Gadezai
 Salarzai
 Chagharzai

Bajaur District

 Bar Chamer Kand Tehsil
 Barang Tehsil
 Khar Bajaur Tehsil
 Mamund Tehsil
 Nawagai Tehsil
 Salarzai Tehsil
 Utmankhel Tehsil

Upper Chitral District
 Buni Tehsil
 Mastuj Tehsil
 Mulkhow/Torkhow Tehsil

Lower Chitral District
 Chitral Tehsil
 Drosh Tehsil

Lower Dir District

 Adenzai Tehsil
 Lal Qilla Tehsil
 Samar Bagh Tehsil 
 Timergara Tehsil
 Khal Tehsil
 Balambat Tehsil
 Munda Tehsil

Malakand District

 Sam Rani Zai Tehsil
 Batkhela Tehsil
 Thana Baizai Tehsil

Shangla District

 Alpuri Tehsil
 Bisham Tehsil
 Puran Tehsil
 Chakesar Tehsil
 Martung Tehsil  
 Makhuzai Tehsil

Swat District

 Babuzai Tehsil (Swat)
 Barikot Tehsil
 Behrain Tehsil
 Charbagh Tehsil
 Kabal Tehsil
 Khwaza Khela Tehsil
 Matta Tehsil

Upper Dir District

 Dir Tehsil
 Sharingal Tehsil
 Wari Tehsil
 Lar jam Tehsil
 Barawal Tehsil
 Kalkot Tehsil

Mardan Division

Mardan District

 Katlang Tehsil
 Rustam Tehsil
 Ghari Kapura Tehsil
 Mardan Tehsil
 Takht Bhai Tehsil
 Lund Khwar Tehsil

Swabi District

 Lahor Tehsil
 Razar Tehsil
 Swabi Tehsil
 Topi Tehsil

Peshawar Division

Charsadda District

 Charsadda Tehsil
 Shabqadar Tehsil
 Tangi Tehsil

Khyber District

 Bara Tehsil
 Jamrud Tehsil
 Landi Kotal Tehsil
 Mula Gori Tehsil

Mohmand District

 Ambar Utman Khel Tehsil
 Halim Zai Tehsil
 Pindiali Tehsil
 Pran Ghar Tehsil
 Safi Tehsil
 Upper Mohmand Tehsil
 Yake Ghund Tehsil

Nowshera District

 Jehangira Tehsil
 Nowshera Tehsil
 Pabbi Tehsil

Peshawar District
 Peshawar City Tehsil
 Shah Alam Tehsil
 Mathra Tehsil
 Chamkani Tehsil
 Badbher Tehsil
 Peshtakhara Tehsil 
 Hassan Kheil Tehsil
 Kalakhel

See also
 List of tehsils in Pakistan

References

 
Geography of Khyber Pakhtunkhwa